Pafuramidine (formulated as the maleic acid salt pafuramidine maleate) is an experimental drug for the treatment of pneumocystis pneumonia (PCP).  In 2006, pafuramidine was given orphan drug status by the US Food and Drug Administration for PCP in patients with HIV/AIDS.  Preliminary clinical trials indicated that pafuramide was effective against pneumocystis pneumonia and had the potential for fewer side effects than the standard treatment with trimethoprim/sulfamethoxazole (TMP-SMX).

Pafuramidine also reached Phase III clinical trials for the treatment of first stage African sleeping sickness, but development was halted in 2008 over concerns about kidney toxicity.

References

Furans
Antiparasitic agents
Amidines